The British University in Egypt (BUE) is a private Egyptian university in El Shorouk City, Cairo, Egypt. Founded in September 2005, through an inter-governmental agreement, the university provides a British style of education and awards degrees validated by its partner UK universities and the Egyptian Supreme Council of Universities.
According to the Center for World University Ranking (CWUR), the BUE was ranked in 2020 among the top 10 universities in Egypt.

University Faculties
 Faculty of Business Administration & Economics & Political Science (Accredited by National Authority for Quality Assurance and Accreditation of Education-NAQAA)
 Faculty of Dentistry (Accredited by National Authority for Quality Assurance and Accreditation of education-NAQAA)
 Faculty of Engineering
 Faculty of Energy and Environmental Engineering
 Faculty of Information & Computer Science
 Faculty of Mass Communication
 Faculty of Nursing
 Faculty of Pharmacy
 Faculty of Arts and humanities
 Faculty of Law
 Faculty of Arts and Design

Prominent Figures
Feryal Abdelaziz the first female Egyptian to have won a gold medal at the Olympic Games graduated from the British university in Egypt, Faculty of Pharmacy.

Board of Trustees
 Mohamed Farid Fouad Khamis (chairman)
Sir David Blatherwick
Lord Sebastian Coe
Sir Derek Plumbly
Sir Magdi Yacoub

See also
 Loughborough University
 Queen Margaret University
 British University in Dubai (BUiD)
 List of Egyptian universities
 London South Bank University

References
قرار جمهوري رقم 344 لسنة 2015 المكمل للقرار الجمهوري رقم 411 لسنة 2004

External links 
 The British University in Egypt web site

Education in Cairo
Educational institutions established in 2005
2005 establishments in Egypt
Universities in Egypt